Qeshlaq-e Luleh Darreh Hajj Meyn Bashi may refer to:
 Qeshlaq-e Luleh Darreh Hajj Meyn Bashi-ye Olya
 Qeshlaq-e Luleh Darreh Hajj Meyn Bashi-ye Sofla